Sapawe may refer to:

 Eva Marion Lake, Ontario
Sapawe, New Mexico